Gad Elbaz is an Israeli Jewish singer who has gained international success and recorded several albums.

Biography
Elbaz is of Moroccan Jewish descent. He began to sing and write music at age four. He first appeared with his father Benny Elbaz, an Israeli singer, accompanying him on the song "Father I Love You". Gad is featured on four CDs with his father. When he was 20, he met his wife Maran who happened to be a fan of his. He later broke out as a solo artist recording ten albums of his own: "Walk in a Straight Path" in 1998, "Light at the End of the Tunnel" in 2003, "Meanings" in 2005, "Almost Quiet" in 2006, “Between the Drops” in 2007, "Live at Caesarea (2 CDs)" in 2008, " Words of Spirit" in 2013, “Nigun Umizmor” in 2014, “Ze Hayom” in 2014, and his latest "Lechaim" in 2017. His multi-city world tours to promote his music and message were successful. His Hashem Melech Tour had over 180 shows in 53 cities. His music videos have been regularly shown on Israeli Music 24 station.

In 2017 and 2018, Gad ranked #1 on the list of Most Views on Youtube by an Orthodox Jewish singer.

Discography

Albums
1999: Honest Roads (in Hebrew: לך בדרכים ישרות)
2003: Light at the End of the Tunnel (in Hebrew: אור בקצה המנהרה)
2004: Meanings (both CD and DVD) (in Hebrew: משמעויות)
2006: Almost Quiet (in Hebrew: כמעט שקט)
2008: Between the Drops (in Hebrew: בין הטיפות)
2008: Live at Caesarea (2 CDs) (in Hebrew: הופעה חיה בקיסריה)
2013: Words of Spirit (in Hebrew: מילים של רוח)
2014: Nigun Umizmor (in Hebrew: ניגון ומזמור)
2014: Ze Hayom (in Hebrew: זה היום)
2017: L'Chaim

Singles

1998: "Aba, Otcha Ani Ohev" (meaning: "Daddy, I Love You") (at 4-years old, with his father Benny Elbaz)
2004: "Halayla Zeh Hazman" (meaning: "Tonight is the Night"; in Hebrew: הלילה זה הזמן) - ft. Alon De Loco (in Hebrew: אלון דה לוקו)
2005: "Or" (meaning: "Light"; in Hebrew: אור) - (Alon De Loco [in Hebrew: אלון דה לוקו]) featuring Gad Elbaz
2008: "Mizmor Ledavid" (meaning: "A Psalm of David"; in Hebrew: מזמור לדוד)
2010: "Just a Prayer Away" (originally in English)
2013: "Hashem Melech" (meaning: "God is the King"; in Hebrew: "ה' מלך") (The song's melody samples on Khaled's song "C'est la Vie")
2013: "Open up" (Hebrew and English version)
2014: "Miracles (Al Hanisim)" (feat. Naftali Kalfa and Ari Lesser)
2014: "Bring Back Our Boys"
2014: "Min Hameitzar" (meaning: "From the Straits")
2014: "Hava Nagila" (meaning:"Let us rejoice") - an adaptation of the song with new lyrics
2015: "Ma Nishtana" (meaning: "Why is it Different")
2015: "Avinu" (meaning: "Our Father")
2016: "Besearaich" (meaning: "In Your Gates")
2016: "Hashem Melech 2.0" (feat. Nissim), melody based on that of "C'est la Vie" by Khaled
2016: "Rise Again (Betifara)" credited to Gabriel Tumbak featuring Gad Elbaz, 
2016: "WeR1" ft. Gad Elbaz, Refael Mirila, Alliel, DeScribe, and Nissim
2016: "Meefo Lehatchil"
2017: "L'Chaim" (feat. Nissim), with melody based on a part of song of Shabbat Deror Yikra

References

External links
 
 

1982 births
Israeli Sephardi Jews
Chabad-Lubavitch Hasidim
21st-century Israeli male singers
Israeli Hasidim
Israeli pop singers
Israeli people of Moroccan-Jewish descent
Jewish singers
Hasidic singers
Living people
People from Rehovot
Jewish songwriters